The Door was a two-part celebrity series broadcast on the ITV Network in the United Kingdom and was hosted by Amanda Holden (Wild at Heart) and Chris Tarrant (Who Wants to Be a Millionaire?).

Keith Duffy and Dean Gaffney made it to the final with Duffy winning the show with Gaffney as the runner-up.

Overview
Six celebrities pass through a series of doors and take on a number of tough challenges. The last star standing claims a cash prize for their chosen charity. The show has been compared to classic TV show The Crystal Maze.

Celebrities

Broadcast and reception
The series average, based on overnight ratings was 3.545m, equating to a 15.15% viewing share.

References

2010s British reality television series
2010 British television series debuts
2010 British television series endings
ITV game shows
Television series by ITV Studios
2010s British game shows